This is a list of adult animated films that were made from the 1920s onwards. These are films intended for a more mature audience than many animated films, both short and feature. They are often distinct from television series or web series.

1920s

1950s and 1960s

1970s

1980s

1990s

2000s

2010s

2020s

Upcoming

See also
 LGBT representation in adult animation
 Modern animation in the United States
 Lists of animated feature films
 Independent animation
 Animation in the United States in the television era
 Cartoon violence

References

Adult animated films
Adult
-